Lost Soul is a Polish technical death metal band established in 1990 in Wrocław. Lost Soul has released five studio albums, which have been highly acclaimed by both fans and journalists. The band's 2009 album, Immerse in Infinity, was promoted with the first video ever recorded by the band for the song "...If The Dead Can Speak".

History 
The band was set up in 1990 in Wrocław by singer and guitar player Jacek Grecki, bass player Tomasz Fornalski and drummer Adam Sierżęga. The first songs were recorded two years later and released as a demo Eternal Darkness. Another demo Superior Ignotum recorded in Fors Studio in Czech Republic came out in 1993. In 1995 Lost Soul signed a deal with Baron Records label. Re-recorded Superior Ignotum was combined with two extra songs from the first recording of the band. Soon after due to personal disagreements the band's activity was suspended. 

In 1997 Lost Soul returned with a new addition to the line-up – guitar player Piotr Ostrowski. The next year they entered Selani Studio in Olsztyn to record new demo ...Now is Forever. Soon after Tomasz Fornalski left the band and was replaced by Krzysztof Artur Zagórowicz (also in Shemhamforash). At that time the band's concert activity was increased – Lost Soul played with Dying Fetus, Monstrosity, and Kataklysm, and appeared on such festivals as Obscene Extreme Festival and Silesian Open Air. In 1999 ...Now is Forever was released on Disco's Out, Slaughter's In compilation released by Novum Vox Mortis records and on Polish Assault released by Relapse Records one year later.

In 2000 the debut album Scream of the Mourning Star was released in Poland by Metal Mind Records and worldwide via Relapse Records. The album was enthusiastically reviewed by critics and fans. Two years later, in May 2002 Lost Soul signed another contract with Empire Records for the release of their second album Übermensch (Death of God). This one hit the stores in August and several months later Osmose Productions released this one worldwide.

In October 2002 Lost Soul took part in the Thrash'em All Festival, playing in the ten biggest Polish cities with Monstrosity, Vomitory, Trauma, Dissenter, Sceptic and Contempt. Soon after due to personal reasons Krzysztof Artur Zagórowicz left the band. Paweł Michałowski took over bass duties and with this addition to the line-up Lost Soul played Hell Festival together with KAT and Ancient Rites among others. 2003 was the year of another tour – this time with Hell-Born and Quo Vadis and an appearance on the famous Metalmania Festival together with Samael, Marduk, Vader, Saxon and Malevolent Creation. 

On 3 March 2003 Übermensch (Death of God) was released worldwide and Lost Soul embarked on Empire Invasion Tour with Dies Irae, Hate and Esqarial. After that tour Paweł Michałowski left the band and was replaced by returning member, Tomasz Fornalski. In April 2004 this line-up recorded in Hertz Studio the third full length album entitled Chaostream, where for the first time Lost Soul decided to use 7-string guitars during recordings. In July Tomasz Fornalski quit and was replaced by Damian "Czajnik" Czajkowski. In October Lost Soul took part in Blitzkrieg II tour playing together with Vader, CETI and Crionics in 17 cities in Poland.

Chaostream was released in 2005 – this time via Wicked World Records (Earache Records sublabel). Cover artwork was designed by Greek artist Seth Siro Anton. The album was promoted on three tours. First on was Mega Strike Europe in Chaos Tour during April and May 2005 together with Fleshgore and Sanatorium - 24 cities in 10 European countries. Then followed Summer Tour 2005, together with Vader i Desecreation, all bands played 10 gigs in 3 countries. Third tour was Blitzkrieg III spanning 48 cities in Poland and Europe. Lost Soul shared the stage with Anorexia Nervosa, Rotting Christ and Vader.

In 2006 the band was split - Adam Sierżęga and Piotr Ostrowski left its ranks. In 2008 the band returned to full activity with Krzysztof "Desecrate" Szałkowski on drums (also in Naamah, Pyorrhoea and Gortal). At the beginning of 2009 second guitar player Dominik "Domin" Prykiel completed the line-up and Lost Soul started working on the fourth album Immerse in Infinity. This album was released on 6 October 2009 by Witching Hour Productions. The band together with Endorfina video company recorded promotional videoclip for the song "...If The Dead Can Speak". The band took part in Blitzkrieg V tour for two concerts together with Vader and Marduk presenting new songs from the album Immerse in Infinity.

In 2010 Lost Souls toured again – this time as special guest on 11 concerts of Aealo Tour with  Rotting Christ. During summer the band played several open-air festivals including XV Brutal Assault in Czech Republic, and played some separate concerts supporting Bolt Thrower and Gojira. In December 2010 Lost Soul celebrated 20 years of existence with a special show under the moniker Genesis - XX Years Of ChaoZ in Madness club in Wrocław. This performance also announced the new compilation album of the same name. Lost Soul played with such acts as Trauma, Hermh, Crionics, Gortal, Extinct Gods and F.A.M.

Band members 

 Current members
 Jacek Grecki – vocals, guitar 
 Rafał Przewłocki – bass 
 Michał Włosik – guitar 

 Former members
 Adam Sierżęga – drums 
 Tomasz Fornalski – bass 
 Piotr Ostrowski – guitar 
 Krzysztof Artur Zagórowicz – bass 
 Paweł Michałowski – bass 
 Damian "Czajnik" Czajkowski – bass 
 Krzysztof "Desecrate" Szałkowski – drums 
 Dominik "Domin" Prykiel – guitar 
 Paweł "Paul" Jaroszewicz – drums 
 Marek Gołaś – guitar 
 Asmodeus Draco Dux – drums 
 Rafał Miedziński – drums 

 Timeline

Discography

Studio albums 
 Scream of the Mourning Star (2000)
 Übermensch (Death of God) (2002)
 Chaostream (2005)
 Immerse in Infinity (2009)
 Atlantis: The New Beginning (2015)

Demos 
 Eternal Darkness (1993)
 Superior Ignotum (1994)
 ...Now Is Forever (1998)

Compilations 
 Genesis - XX Years of ChaoZ (2013)

Splits 
 Disco's Out, Slaughter's In (1999)
 Polish Assault (2000)

Videos 
 "...If The Dead Can Speak" (2009, Directed by: Endorfina)

Awards

References

External links 

 
 Lost Soul on YouTube

Polish death metal musical groups
Polish heavy metal musical groups
Relapse Records artists
Musical groups established in 1991
Earache Records artists
Musical quartets
1991 establishments in Poland